Psorinia is a genus of fungi in the  family Lecanoraceae.

References

External links
Index Fungorum

Lecanoraceae
Lichen genera
Lecanorales genera